Magnus Gustafsson was the defending champion, but lost in the second round to Tomás Carbonell.

Horst Skoff won the title by defeating Ronald Agénor 7–5, 1–6, 6–0 in the final.

Seeds

Draw

Finals

Top half

Bottom half

References

External links
 Official results archive (ATP)
 Official results archive (ITF)

Men's Singles]